Beheading was a standard method of execution in pre-modern Islamic law. By the end of the 20th century, its use had been abandoned in most countries. Beheading is still a legal method of execution in Saudi Arabia, Qatar, and Yemen. In Iran, beheading was last used in 2001, according to Amnesty International; however, it is no longer in use.

In recent times, extremist Jihadist organizations such as ISIS and Jama'at al-Tawhid wal-Jihad have used beheading as a method of killing captives. Since 2002, ISIS have circulated beheading videos as a form of terror and propaganda. Their actions have been condemned by militant and other terrorist groups, as well as by mainstream Islamic scholars and organizations.

Beheading: background and context

The use of beheading for punishment continued well into the 20th century in both Islamic and non-Islamic nations. When done properly, it was once considered a humane and honorable method of execution.

Beheading in Islamic scripture

There is a debate as to whether the Quran discusses beheading. Two surahs could potentially be used to provide a justification for beheading in the context of war:

When the Lord inspired the angels (saying) I am with you. So make those who believe stand firm. I will throw fear into the hearts of those who disbelieve. Then smite the necks and smite of them each finger. (8:12)
Now when ye meet in battle those who disbelieve, then it is smiting of the necks until, when ye have routed them, making fast of bonds; and afterward either grace or ransom 'til the war lay down its burdens. (47:4)

Among classical commentators, Fakhr al-Din al-Razi interprets the last sentence of 8:12 to mean striking at the enemies in any way possible, from their head to the tips of their extremities. Al-Qurtubi reads the reference to striking at the necks as conveying the gravity and severity of the fighting. For al-Qurtubi, al-Tabari, and Ibn Kathir, the expression indicates the brevity of the act, as it is confined to battle and is not a continuous command.

Some commentators have suggested that terrorists use alternative interpretations of these surahs to justify beheading captives, however there is agreement among scholars that they have a different meaning. Furthermore, according to Rachel Saloom, surah 47:4 goes on to recommend generosity or ransom when waging war, and it refers to a period when Muslims were persecuted and had to fight for their survival.

Beheading in Islamic law 

Beheading was the normal method of executing the death penalty under classical Islamic law. It was also, together with hanging, one of the ordinary methods of execution in the Ottoman Empire.

Currently, Saudi Arabia is the only country in the world which uses decapitation within its Islamic legal system. The majority of executions carried out by the Wahhabi government of Saudi Arabia are public beheadings, which usually cause mass gatherings but are not allowed to be photographed or filmed.

According to Amnesty, beheading have been carried out by state authorities in Iran as recently as 2001, but as of 2014 is no longer in use.
It is also a legal form of execution in Qatar and Yemen, but the punishment has been suspended in those countries.

Historical occurrences 
 The Islamic followers of Mohammed executed the men of the Jewish tribe of Banu Qurayza for an alleged treaty violation, with several hundred killed in 627.
 After the Battle of Hattin (1187), Saladin personally beheaded Raynald of Châtillon; a Christian knight who served in the Second Crusade and organized attacks against Islam's two holiest cities.
Forces of the Ottoman Empire invaded and laid siege to the city of Otranto and its citadel in 1480. According to a traditional account, after capture, more than 800 of its inhabitants – who refused to convert to Islam – were beheaded. They are known as the "Martyrs of Otranto". Historicity of this account has been questioned by modern scholars.
 Muhammad Ahmad declared himself Mahdi in 1880 and led Jihad against the Ottoman Empire and their British allies. He and his followers beheaded opponents, Christian and Muslim alike including the British general Charles Gordon.

Modern use by non-state actors

Modern instances of Islamist beheading date at least to the early 1990s. 

At the beginning of the Bosnian War (1992-95), anywhere from 500-6,000 foreign volunteers (mostly from the Gulf States, the Levant, and South Asia) travelled to Bosnia (with the support of the Croatian government at the time) to volunteer for jihad and fight alongside the Bosniaks that were being heavily persecuted against. Most came into Bosnia and Herzegovina under the guise of being volunteer aid workers and freelance journalists, complete with fake identification cards and passports. When they arrived in Bosnia, they formed a volunteer brigade called the El-Mudžahid along with some local Bosniak volunteers, and were affiliated with the 3rd Corps (although they weren't officialy absorbed into the Bosnian Army, and also had quite a bit of internal conflict and strife amongst the two organizations due to differing views on Islam, culture, and politics). The El-Mudžahid were notorious for their brutal tactics and ferocious fighting on the battlefield, along with how they treated their POW's. There was several cases of decapitation that happened to POW's, along with being tortured severly before-hand. In the most famous case, there is an amateur video (along with a photo) taken of a foreign fighter decapitating and holding the severed head of a Serb POW up to the camera. Before the subsequent video was taken, 2 Serb POW's (Momir Mitrović and Predrag Knežević) were captured, subjected to severe beatings and had their hands and feet bound together for hours on end. After beating and torturing the prisoners for hours, the foreign fighter slit the throats of the two Serb POW's and then proceeded to decapitate them, to which after they held the head of one of the POW's up in "celebration". There also have been many other documented cases of decapitation happening at the hands of El-Mudžahid during the Bosnian War. 

In the First Chechen War (1994–96), the beheading of Yevgeny Rodionov, a Russian soldier who refused to convert to Islam, led some within the Russian Orthodox Church to venerate him as a martyr. 

In 1997, the Armed Islamic Group of Algeria beheaded 80-200 villagers in Benthalia.

The 2002 beheading of American journalist Daniel Pearl by Al-Qaeda member Khalid Sheikh Mohammed in Pakistan drew international attention enhanced by the release of a beheading video. Revulsion in the Muslim community led al Qaeda to abandon video beheadings. Groups in Iraq led by Abu Musab al-Zarqawi, Tawhid and Jihad and later ISIL, continued the practice. Since 2002, they have been mass circulating beheading videos as a form of terror and propaganda. One of al-Zarqawi's most publicized murders was that of American Nick Berg.

Since 2004 insurgents in South Thailand began to sow fear in attacks where men and women of the local Buddhist minority were beheaded. On 18 July 2005 two terrorists entered a teashop in South Thailand, shot Lek Pongpla, a Buddhist cloth vendor, beheaded him and left the head outside of the shop. The founder of Bridges TV, a Muslim cable channel in originally based in Buffalo, NY that aimed to combat negative perceptions of Muslims that were allegedly dominating mainstream media coverage, beheaded his wife in 2009 in the offices of Bridges TV.

According to Peter R. Neumann, Director of the International Centre for the Study of Radicalisation and Political Violence at King's College London, viral beheading videos are intended, and are at least somewhat effective, as a recruiting tool for jihad among both Western and Middle Eastern youth. Other observers argue that while Al Qaeda initially used beheading as a publicity tool, it later decided that they caused Muslims to recoil from Islamism and that although ISIS/IS is enthusiastically deploying beheading as a tactic in 2014, it, too, may find that the tactic backfires. Timothy R. Furnish, as assistant professor of Islamic History, contrasts the Saudi government executions, conforming to standards that minimize pain, with the non-state actors who have "chosen a slow, torturous sawing method to terrorize the Western audience."

In 2020 a teacher was murdered and beheaded in France, apparently for showing his students cartoons of Muhammad. Similarly Kanhaiya Lal also beheaded by two Islamist on the name of Islam over Nupur Sharma's comments on Prophet Muhammad.

Over fifty people were beheaded by Islamic terrorists in the Cabo Delgado Province of Mozambique in early November 2020.

ISIL beheading incidents

In January 2015, a copy of an ISIL penal code surfaced describing the penalties it enforces in areas under its control, including beheadings. Beheading videos have been frequently posted by ISIL members to social media. Several of the videoed beheadings were conducted by Mohammed Emwazi, whom the media had referred to as "Jihadi John" before his identification.

The beheadings received wide coverage around the world and attracted international condemnation. Political scientist Max Abrahms posited that ISIL may be using well-publicized beheadings as a means of differentiating itself from Al-Qaeda in Iraq (AQI), and identifying itself with Khalid Sheikh Mohammed, the al-Qaeda member who beheaded Daniel Pearl. Beheadings represent a small proportion of a larger total of people killed following capture by ISIL.

Condemnation by Muslims

Mainstream Islamic scholars and organizations around the world, as well as other organizations such as Hezbollah, Hamas, Al-Qaeda and the Taliban have condemned the practice.

Impact on war coverage

Some analysts have argued that the beheadings of journalists and aid workers, along with other abductions and executions of independent observers in Syrian war zones, have forced international media to rely exclusively on reporting which is directly or indirectly influenced by rebel and opposition groups and in this way allowed the latter to dictate the coverage of events in areas under their control.

See also
 Capital punishment in Islam
Capital punishment in Saudi Arabia
Islamic terrorism

References

Jihadism
Terrorism tactics
Psychological warfare techniques
 
Execution methods
History of Islam
Islam and capital punishment